Platypria (Platypria) erinaceus, is a species of leaf beetle native to India and Sri Lanka.

Description
Antenna thick, which is not extending beyond scutellum over pronotum.

Biology
It is found in wide varieties of host plants including: Desmodium gangeticum, Erythrina, Pueraria tuberosa, Oryza sativa, Saccharum officinarum, Ziziphus jujuba, Ziziphus mauritiana and Ziziphus nummularia.

It has observed that chalcid wasps lay their eggs on the late larval instars of the beetle.

References 

Cassidinae
Insects of Sri Lanka
Beetles described in 1801